Sanu may refer to:

Sanu, Iran, village in the Razavi Khorasan Province, Iran
Serbian Academy of Sciences and Arts (SANU), an academic institution in Serbia
Sudan African National Union, a political party in Sudan
South American native ungulates (SANUs), prehistoric hoofed mammals of South America
Sanu railway station, a railway station in India

People
People with Sanu as first name
Sanu Sharma, Australian writer of Nepalese nationality 
Sanu Sherpa, Nepalese mountaineer  
Sanu Siva Nepalese politician
Sanu Varghese, Indian cinematographer

People with Sanu as middle name
Zinat Sanu Swagata, Bangladeshi actress

People with Sanu as last name
Kumar Sanu (born 1957), Indian singer
M. K. Sanu, Malayali writer, critic, retired professor, biographer, journalist, orator, social activist, and human rights activist.
Mohamed Sanu (born 1989), American American football player
V. P. Sanu Indian politician
Yaqub Sanu (1839-1912), Egyptian journalist, nationalist and playwright